Eugene Group is a large South Korean chaebol (conglomerate), producing industry, media, construction, and confectionery products that was founded in 1954. It also has subsidiaries that provide financial, IT, advertising, broadcasting, logistics, and food services. In addition, it operates a couple golf courses and home improvement stores.

Subsidiaries
Eugene Concrete
Eugene Basic Materials Company
Tongyang Inc.
Eugene Total Development Company
Dream City (Eugene Group)
Eugene Dream Networks
Eugene Broadband Solutions
Eugene IT Service
EM Media
Korea Logistics
Purunsol Golf Club
Yeongyang Confectionery
Eugene Investment & Securities
Eugene Asset Management
Eugene Investment & Futures
Eugene Private Equity
Eugene Savings Bank
Ace Home Center, partnered with Ace Hardware
Home Day, a home improvement retailer

See also
List of Korean companies
Chaebol
Economy of South Korea

External links
Eugene Group Homepage 

 
Chaebol
Conglomerate companies of South Korea
Companies based in Seoul